Memory manager may refer to:
 Memory management, a form of resource management applied to computer memory
 Memory management unit, primarily performing the translation of virtual memory addresses to physical addresses
 DOS memory management
 Expanded memory manager (EMM)
 Extended memory manager (XMM)
 HIMEM.SYS
 80386 memory manager, may manage both expanded and extended memory
 386MAX
 CEMM
 EMM386
 QEMM